Jorge Carlos Zambrana Echagüe (born 28 March 1986 in Uruguay) is a Uruguayan footballer.

Career

Zambrana started his career with the Uruguayan Club Atlético River Plate, where he scored over 21 goals before joining Peñarol, the most successful team in Uruguay. From Peñarol, Zambrana signed for Venezuelan side Carabobo for financial reasons, before playing for Danubio, Fénix, and Cerro Largo, where he had trouble adapting to the Uruguayan second division.

After playing in Argentinean clubs San Martín de Tucumán and  San Jorge de Tucumán, he claimed that the pitches were better in the Argentinean lower leagues than in Uruguay.

References

External links
 Jorge Zambrana at Soccerway

Living people
Uruguayan footballers
Association football midfielders
Association football forwards
Association football wingers
Uruguayan Primera División players
Uruguayan Segunda División players
Club Atlético River Plate (Montevideo) players
Peñarol players
Carabobo F.C. players
Danubio F.C. players
Cerro Largo F.C. players
Boston River players
San Martín de Tucumán footballers
Concepción Fútbol Club players
C.A. Rentistas players
San Jorge de Tucumán footballers
Central Español players
Racing Club de Montevideo players
1986 births